Alvim is a village of Sarpsborg, Norway.

References 

Villages in Østfold
Sarpsborg